Banamalipur may refer to:

Banamalipur, a locality in Agartala, Tripura
Banamalipur (Tripura Vidhan Sabha constituency)
Banamalipur, Hooghly, a village in Hooghly district, West Bengal